Dean Bartlett (born 10 October 1987) is a New Zealand cricketer. He plays first-class cricket for Auckland.

See also
 List of Auckland representative cricketers

References

External links
 

1987 births
Living people
New Zealand cricketers
Auckland cricketers
Cricketers from Auckland